Family with sequence similarity 3, member D is a protein that in humans is encoded by the FAM3D gene.

References

Further reading 

Genes
Human proteins